C. Douglas Cairns Recreation Arena, more commonly known as Cairns Arena, is a 600-seat hockey arena in South Burlington, Vermont. It is home to the Saint Michael's College Purple Knights men's and women's ice hockey teams, the University of Vermont club ice hockey team, and a number of high school hockey teams. It was the former home to the Green Mountain Glades Junior A ice hockey team of the Eastern Junior Hockey League, who have since moved operations to Portland, Maine.

The Arena comprises two NHL-sized ice rinks, each with a seating capacity of 600, a café, and a pro shop. It also served as a venue for the 2012 IIHF Women's World Championship, along with Gutterson Fieldhouse.

References
Cairns Arena Official site
Purple Knights Ice Hockey

College ice hockey venues in the United States
Indoor ice hockey venues in the United States
Sports venues in Vermont
Buildings and structures in South Burlington, Vermont
Indoor arenas in Vermont